The Shepparton East Football Club, now nicknamed the Eagles, is an Australian rules football club playing in the Kyabram District Football League. The club was formerly known as the Bombers.

The club is based in the central Victorian city of Shepparton.

Club history
The Shepparton East Football Club was originally called the Settlement United Football Club and was formed in 1920 and was based at Shepparton East and originally played their games on the Central Recreation Oval.

The Settlement United FC originally played in the Shepparton District Junior Football Association in 1920 and the club's first 
president and "founder" was Neal Hanlon.

The Shepparton East Football Club were first admitted into the Ardmona Central Junior Football Association in 1924.

The Shepparton East Football Club won the 1926 – Goulburn Valley Second Eighteens Football Association premiership, but folded in 1927, due to a lack of playing numbers.

Shepparton East FC reformed in 1944, winning the 1944 Shepparton Sunday Football Association premiership, then moved across to the Goulburn Valley Football Association, Saturday competition in 1945, wearing the black and gold colors.

The club now known as Shepparton United Football Club was originally called City United. It was admitted to the Goulburn Valley Football League in 1950 and had grown out of the Shepparton Preserving Company Football Club (SPC) and Shepparton East Football Club, who had previously fielded separate teams in the Central Goulburn Valley Football League. Shepparton East retained their own side in the Central Goulburn Valley Football League from 1950 to 1952.

When the Central Goulburn Valley Football League folded n 1953, Shepparton East applied for admission into the GVFL Second 18 competition, but their application was rejected.

Shepparton East played in the Kyabram & District Football League from 1956 to 1961, winning four consecutive premierships between 1958 and 1961.

Shepparton East played in the Tungamah Football League between 1968 and 1995, then played in the Goulburn Valley Football League – Division 2 competition between 1996 and 1998.

Shepparton East played in the Central Goulburn Football League from 1999 to 2005.

Following the collapse of the Central Goulburn Football League in 2005, Shepparton East entered the Picola & District Football League in 2006 and won the premiership in their first season. The Eagles have played off for the last four Picola & District South East premierships, winning in 2010 and 2012.

The club was forced to changed leagues following an administration disagreement between the AFL Goulburn-Valley and the Picola & District Football League.

They spent 2018 in the Murray Football League before transferring to the Kyabram District Football Netball League for the 2019 season

Football Premierships
Seniors

Picola & District Football League
2006, 2010 (undefeated), 2012, 2016 (undefeated)
Central Goulburn Football League
2001, 2004
Tungamah Football League
1980, 1985, 1994, 1995
Kyabram & District Football League
1958, 1959, 1960, 1961
Central Goulburn Valley Football League
1948 – Shepparton East: 10.12 – 72 d Shepparton: 10.7 – 67 
Goulburn Valley Football Association
1945 – Shepparton East: 10.9 – 69 defeated SPC: 9.5 – 59 
Shepparton Sunday Football Association
 1944 – Shepparton East: 11.11 – 77 d SPC: 8.14 – 62 
Goulburn Valley Second Eighteens Football Association
1926

Football: Runners Up
Seniors
Ardmona Central Junior Football Association
1925 – Undera: 5.9 – 39 d Shepparton East: 4.3 – 27 
Tungamah Football League
1981 – Benalla All Blacks: 20.11 – 131 d Shepparton East: 13.12 – 90
1988 – Alexandra: 15.16 – 106 d Shepparton East: 10.10 – 70

Club Leaders

References

External links
Official Site

Picola & District Football League clubs
Australian rules football clubs in Victoria (Australia)
1925 establishments in Australia